The 2008 Men's Ice Hockey World Championships was the 72nd such event hosted by the International Ice Hockey Federation. Teams representing 48 countries participated in four levels of competition. The competition also served as qualification for division placements in the 2009 competition. In the Division I Championship held in April, Austria and Hungary were promoted to the Championship division, while South Korea and Estonia were demoted to Division II. In the Division II competition, Romania and Australia were promoted, Ireland and New Zealand were relegated to Division III. Greece won the Division III qualification in February, and competed in the Division III competition from March to April. In that competition, North Korea and South Africa were promoted to Division II in 2009.

Championship

Final standings

 — relegated to Division I for 2009
 — relegated to Division I for 2009

Division I 

Twelve teams comprise Division I. They are broken into two groups, with the winner of each group gaining promotion to the World Championship pool for the following year.

Group A
Final standings

 — promoted to Championship pool for 2009

 — relegated to Division II for 2009

Group B
Final standings

 — promoted to Championship pool for 2009

 — relegated to Division II for 2009

Division II 

Twelve teams comprise Division II. They are also broken into two groups competing to advance into Division I.

Group A
Final standings
 — promoted to Division I for 2010

 — relegated to Division III for 2010

Group B
Final standings
 — promoted to Division I for 2010

 — relegated to Division III for 2010

Division III 

Division III is made up of six teams. The top two teams are promoted to Division II for the following year.

Final standings

 — promoted to Division II for 2009
 — promoted to Division II for 2009

Division III Qualification 

Three teams comprise the Division III Qualification with the winning team advancing to the 2008 Division III competition.

Final standings

 — qualified for the 2008 IIHF World Championship Division III

See also 
 2008 World Juniors
 2008 Women's
 2008 Men's U18
 2008 Women's U18

References

External links
 IIHF Website
 Complete results at Passionhockey.com

 
World Ice Hockey Championships - Men's
IIHF Men's World Ice Hockey Championships